In geometry, an omnitruncated polyhedron is a truncated quasiregular polyhedron. When they are alternated, they produce the snub polyhedra.

All omnitruncated polyhedra are zonohedra. They have Wythoff symbol p q r | and vertex figures as 2p.2q.2r.

More generally an omnitruncated polyhedron is a bevel operator in Conway polyhedron notation.

List of convex omnitruncated polyhedra

There are three convex forms. They can be seen as red faces of one regular polyhedron, yellow or green faces of the dual polyhedron, and blue faces at the truncated vertices of the quasiregular polyhedron.

List of nonconvex omnitruncated polyhedra

There are 5 nonconvex uniform omnitruncated polyhedra.

Other even-sided nonconvex polyhedra 

There are 8 nonconvex forms with mixed Wythoff symbols p q (r s) |, and bow-tie shaped vertex figures, 2p.2q.-2q.-2p. They are not true omnitruncated polyhedra: the true omnitruncates p q r | or p q s | have coinciding 2r-gonal or 2s-gonal faces respectively that must be removed to form a proper polyhedron. All these polyhedra are one-sided, i.e. non-orientable. The p q r | degenerate Wythoff symbols are listed first, followed by the actual mixed Wythoff symbols.

General omnitruncations (bevel)
Omnitruncations are also called cantitruncations or truncated rectifications (tr), and Conway's bevel (b) operator. When applied to nonregular polyhedra, new polyhedra can be generated, for example these 2-uniform polyhedra:

See also 
 Uniform polyhedron

References 

 

 Har'El, Z. Uniform Solution for Uniform Polyhedra., Geometriae Dedicata 47, 57-110, 1993. Zvi Har’El, Kaleido software, Images, dual images
  Mäder, R. E. Uniform Polyhedra. Mathematica J. 3, 48-57, 1993.

Polyhedra